Rhynencina is a genus of fruit flies in the family Tephritidae. There are about five described species in Rhynencina.

Species
Rhynencina dysphanes (Steyskal, 1979)
Rhynencina emphanes (Steyskal, 1979)
Rhynencina longirostris Johnson, 1922
Rhynencina spilogaster (Steyskal, 1979)
Rhynencina xanthogaster (Steyskal, 1979)

References

Tephritinae
Diptera of North America
Taxa named by Charles Willison Johnson